Scott Field  is a public airport located two miles (3 km) northwest of the central business district of Mangum, a city in Greer County, Oklahoma, United States. It is owned by the City of Mangum.

Facilities and aircraft 
For the 12-month period ending January 24, 2006, the airport had 3,000 aircraft operations, 100% of which were general aviation.

References

External links 

Airports in Oklahoma